Castrogiovanni may refer to:
the former name of Enna, a town in Italy
Martín Castrogiovanni (born 1981), Italian rugby player